Agylla vittata is a moth of the family Erebidae. It was described by John Henry Leech in 1899. It is found in northern China.

References

Moths described in 1899
vittata
Moths of Asia